The following highways are numbered 897:

United States